Richard Francis may refer to:

 Richard Francis (cricketer), English cricketer
 Richard Powell Francis (1860–1894), first Australian to graduate from Balliol College, died after rescuing others in the 1893 Brisbane flood
 Dick Francis (Richard Stanley Francis, 1920–2010), British crime writer and jockey